Anna Susanne Moberg (born 13 February 1986) is a former Swedish footballer who played for Damallsvenskan club Kristianstads DFF and the Swedish national team. She was one of four reserve players named in the national squad for the 2012 Summer Olympics.

Moberg made her senior national team debut against Germany in October 2011.

She was attached to Malmö FF as a youth player but became unsettled and returned home to Ystad. After signing for Kristianstads DFF in 2003, she missed eight months across the 2005 and 2006 seasons with an anterior cruciate ligament injury. Moberg is a qualified teacher.

In May 2013 it was reported that a loss of form had seen Moberg dropped from Kristianstads' starting 11, jeopardising her chances of being selected for UEFA Women's Euro 2013.

In October 2015, after having played all 13 seasons of her professional career for Kristianstads, a team she also captained for years, Moberg announced she was retiring from football at the conclusion of the 2015 Damallsvenskan season.

Notes

References

External links
 
 

1986 births
Living people
Swedish women's footballers
Olympic footballers of Sweden
Sweden women's international footballers
Kristianstads DFF players
Damallsvenskan players
Women's association football forwards